Shandria Brown (born 7 July 1983) is a Bahamian sprinter who specializes in the 200 metres. Her personal best time is 23.27 seconds, achieved in May 2003 in Edwardsville, Illinois.

She finished fourth in 4 x 100 metres relay at the 2004 Summer Olympics, with teammates Tamicka Clarke, Chandra Sturrup and Debbie Ferguson.

References

sports-reference

1983 births
Living people
Bahamian female sprinters
Athletes (track and field) at the 2003 Pan American Games
Athletes (track and field) at the 2007 Pan American Games
Pan American Games competitors for the Bahamas
Athletes (track and field) at the 2004 Summer Olympics
Olympic athletes of the Bahamas
Olympic female sprinters